Laxmi Prasad Devkota (1909-1959) was a Nepali poet, playwright, novelist, and a politician. Honored with the title of Mahakabi in Nepali literature, he was known as a poet with a golden heart. He is considered to be one of the greatest and most famous literary figures in Nepal. Some of his popular works include the best-selling Muna Madan, along with Sulochana, Kunjini, Bhikhari, and Shakuntala.

Life

Early life 
Devkota was born on the night of Lakshmi Puja on 13 November 1909 (27 Kartik 1966 BS) to father Teel Madhav Devkota and mother Amar Rajya Lakshmi Devi in Dhobidhara, Kathmandu. His father was a Sanskrit scholar, so he attained his basic education under the custodianship of his father. He started his formal education at Durbar High School, where he studied both Sanskrit grammar and English. After finishing his matriculation exams from Patna at the age of 17, he pursued Bachelor of Arts along with Bachelor of Laws at Tri-Chandra College and graduated from Patna University as a private examinee. His desire to complete his master's degree was left incomplete due to his family's financial conditions.

Only after a decade from his graduation as a lawyer, he started working in Nepal Bhasaanuwad Parishad (Publication Censor Board), where he met famous playwright Balkrishna Sama. At the same time, he also worked as a lecturer at Tri-Chandra College and Padma Kanya College.

Family
Devkota's son, Padma Devkota, is also a poet and writer and served for many years as a professor at the English Department, Tribhuvan University, Kathmandu.

Health
In the late 1930s, Devkota suffered from nervous breakdowns, probably due to the deaths of his parents and his two-month old daughter. Eventually, in 1939, he was admitted to the Mental Asylum of Ranchi, India, for five months. With financial debts later in his life and being unable to finance the weddings and dowries of his daughters. He is once reported to have said to his wife, "Tonight let's abandon the children to the care of society and youth and renounce this world at bedtime and take potassium cyanide or morphine or something like that [sic]."

Later years and death

Laxmi Prasad Devkota was a chain smoker throughout his life. After a long battle with cancer, Devkota died on 14 September 1959, at Pashupati Aryaghat, along the banks of Bagmati river in Pashupatinath Temple, Kathmandu. Prior to his death, Devkota's income was terminated by the Nepal Academy of Literature and Art because he attended the Afro-Asian Writers' Conference, which was held in modern-day Tashkent, without first seeking permission from them. He also spoke at the ceremony, praising well-known figures for their contributions to Nepali literature, including Bhanubhakta Acharya, Lekhnath Paudyal, Pandit Hemraj, and Somnath Sigdel. Devkota claimed in an interview that he hadn't received pay for the previous eight months and that as a result, he had been unable to purchase the medication he needed to treat his disease; moreover, he was struggling to even buy food. Devkota's personality was vibrant and assertive despite the fact that he was battling cancer, but his room was disorganized.

Learning and style
Devkota contributed to Nepali literature by starting a modern Nepali language romantic movement in the country. He was the second writer born in Nepal to begin writing epic poems in Nepali literature. Nepali poetry soared to new heights with Devkota's innovative use of the language.

Departing from the Sanskrit tradition that dominated the Nepali literary scene at the time, and being inspired from the Newar language ballad song Ji Waya La Lachhi Maduni, he wrote Muna Madan (1930), a long narrative poem in a popular Jhyaure bhaka folk tune. Muna Madan is undoubtedly the best-selling book in the history of Nepali literature. The 2003 film Muna Madan, which was Nepal's official entry for the Best Foreign Language Film at the 76th Academy Awards, was based on this poem. The work received immediate recognition from the Ranas—the country's rulers at the time. Muna Madan tells the story of Madan, a traveling merchant, who departs to Tibet in a bid to earn some money leaving behind his wife, Muna. The poem describes the thematic hardships of the journey: the grief of separation, the itching of longing, and the torment of death.

The ballad Ji Waya La Lachhi Maduni is a tragic song based on a Newa merchant, his mother, and his wife. The merchant is about to leave Kathmandu for Tibet on a work. The song starts with the wife pleading with her mother-in-law to stop him, saying that it's not even been a month since she came to their home and he wants to go away. Being raised in Kathmandu, Devkota had heard this song from locals singing it at a local Pati. He was highly fascinated by the song and decided to re-write it in Nepali. Since the Rana rulers had put a ban on the Newa trade, language and literature, he changed the main character from a Newa merchant as in the original song to a Kshatriya (warrior class) character. Although Kshatriya people did not practice trade for their living during those days, he had to depict it as such in order to lure the Rana rulers.

The following couplet, which is among the most famous and frequently quoted lines from the epic, celebrates the triumph of humanity and compassion over the hierarchies created by caste in Nepalese culture.

"क्षेत्रीको छोरो यो पाउ छुन्छ, घिनले छुँदैन
मानिस ठूलो दिलले हुन्छ जातले हुँदैन !"

The son of a Kshatriya touches your feet not with hatred but with love.
A man's greatness is determined by his heart; not by his caste or lineage.

Considered his magnum opus, Muna Madan has remained widely popular among the lay readers of Nepali literature; it remains the most popular Nepali book since 1936; the book was also translated into Mandarin; it was well received by China and considered successful.

Devkota, inspired by his five-month stay in a mental asylum in 1939, wrote a free-verse poem, Pagal. The poem deals with his usual mental ability and is considered one of the best Nepali language poems.

"जरुर साथी म पागल !
यस्तै छ मेरो हाल ।
म शब्दलाई देख्दछु !
दृश्यलाई सुन्दछु !
बासनालाई संबाद लिन्छु ।
आकाशभन्दा पातालका कुरालाई छुन्छु ।
ती कुरा,
जसको अस्तित्व लोक मान्दैंन
जसको आकार संसार जान्दैन !"

Surely, my friend, I am mad,
That’s exactly what I am!
I see a word,
Hear sights,
Taste smells,
I touch things thinner than air,
Those things,
Whose existence the world denies,
Whose shapes the world does not know.

Devkota had the ability to compose long epics and poems with literary complexity and philosophical density in very short periods of time. He wrote Shakuntala, his first epic poem, and also the first Mahakavya written in the Nepali language, in a mere three months. Published in 1945, Shakuntala is a voluminous work in 24 cantos based on Kālidāsa's famous Sanskrit play Abhijñānaśākuntalam. Shakuntala demonstrates Devkota's mastery of Sanskrit meter and diction, which he incorporated heavily while working primarily in Nepali. According to the late scholar and translator of Devkota, David Rubin, Shakuntala is among his greatest accomplishments. "It is, without doubt, a remarkable work, a masterpiece of a particular kind, harmonizing various elements of a classical tradition with a modern point of view, a pastoral with a cosmic allegory, Kālidāsa's romantic comedy of earthly love with a symbolic structure that points to redemption through the coinciding of sensual and sacred love."

Devkota also published several collections of short lyric poems set in various traditional and non-traditional forms and meters. Most of his poetry shows the influence of English Romantic poets like Wordsworth and Coleridge. The title poem in the collection Bhikhari is reminiscent of Wordsworth's "The Old Cumberland Beggar". In this poem, Devkota describes the beggar going about his ways in dire poverty and desolation, deprived of human love and material comforts. On the other hand, the beggar is also seen as the source of compassion placed in the core of suffering and destitution. Devkota connects the beggar with the divine as the ultimate fount of kindness and empathy:

"कालो बादलबाट खसेको 
 अन्धकारमा भित्र पसेको,
 ईश्वर हो कि भिखारी ?
 बोल्दछ ईश्वर हृदय घुसेका 
 घर, घर आँगन चारी
 बोल्दछ, आर्तध्वनिमा बोल्दछ
 करूणामृत दिल भारी ।"

Fallen from the blackest clouds
To enter into darker shrouds,
Is he deity or beggar?
Buddha speaks – his words pierce the heart,
Wandering from house to house, yard to yard,
Now speaking with a voice of pain:
His heart in sorrow cowed.

Many of his poems focus on mundane elements of the human and the natural world. The titles of his poems like Ban, Kisaan, Baadal shows that he sought his poetic inspiration in the commonplace and proximal aspects of the world. What resonates throughout most of his poetry is his profound faith in humanity. For instance, in the poem Ban, the speaker goes through a series of interrogations, rejecting all forms of comfort and solace that could be offered solely to him as an individual. Instead, he embraces his responsibility and concern for his fellow beings. The poem ends with the following quatrain that highlights the speaker's humanistic inclinations:

"दोस्त कहाँ छन्? साथ छ को को? घर हो तिम्रो कुन देश?
जान्छौ कुन पुर भवन मुसाफिर, ल्यायौ कुन सन्देश?
दोस्त मेरो शुभ उद्योगी, साथ छ साहस बेश ।
विश्व सबै घर, हृदय-पुरीतिर ल्याउछु सेवा सन्देश ।।"

Where are your friends? Who goes with you? Which land is your home?
What place do you seek, Traveller? With what news do you roam?
My friend is decent diligence. Courage comes with me.
The whole world is my home. To heartland I roam, with hues of humanity.

Besides poetry, Devkota also made significant contributions to the essay genre. He is considered the father of modern Nepali essay writing. He defied the conventional form of essays and broke the traditional rules of essay writing and embraced a more fluid and colloquial style which had more clarity in meaning, expressive in feelings, and eloquent in terms of language. His essays are generally satirical in tone and are characterized by their trenchant humour and ruthless criticism of the modernizing influences from the West on Nepali society. An essay titled Bhaladmi  or criticizes a decadent trend in Nepali society to respect people based on their outward appearances and outfit rather than their actual inner worth and personality. In another essay titled Ke Nepal Sano Cha?, he expresses deeply nationalistic sentiments inveighing against the colonial forces from British India which, he felt, were encroaching all aspects of Nepali culture. His essays are published in an essays book entitled Laxmi Nibhandha Sanghraha.

Devkota also translated William Shakespeare's play Hamlet into Nepali. Moreover, he translated his own epic, Shakuntala, into English and wrote several poetry, essays, plays, and epics in English.

Politics

Laxmi Prasad Devkota was not active within any well-established political party, but his poetry consistently embodied an attitude of rebellion against the oppressive Rana dynasty. During his self-exile in Varanasi, he started working as an editor of Yugvani newspaper of the Nepali Congress, leading to the confiscation of all his property in Nepal by the Rana Government. After the introduction of democracy through Revolution of 1951, Devkota was appointed member of the Nepal Salahkar Samiti in 1952 by King Tribhuvan. Later in 1957, he was appointed as Minister of Education and Autonomous Governance under the premiership of Kunwar Inderjit Singh.

Publications

Epics

Poetry / short novels / essays / novel

See also
 Nepali literature
 Bhanubhakta Acharya
 Mahakavi Devkota

References

Bibliography

External links

 Some Works by Laxmi Prasad Devkota
 Mahakavi Laxmi Prasad Devkota Study and Research Center
 Some Works by Laxmi Prasad Devkota in original Nepali
 Poems Of Laxmi Prasad Devkota In Nepali (From Laxmi Kavita Sangraha) Compiled By Sanjaal Corps
 Laxmi Prasad Devkota: Nepal's Greatest Poet

1909 births
1959 deaths
20th-century male writers
20th-century Nepalese poets
20th-century translators
Deaths from cancer in Nepal
English–Nepali translators
Epic poets
Literary translators
Lyric poets
Nepalese dramatists and playwrights
Nepalese educators
Nepalese humanists
Nepalese male poets
Nepalese male novelists
Nepalese translators
Nepali-language lyricists
Nepali-language poets
Nepali-language writers
People from Kathmandu
Translators from English
Translators from Nepali
Translators of William Shakespeare
Translators to English
Translators to Nepali
Education ministers of Nepal
Tribhuvan University alumni
Patna University alumni
20th-century Nepalese educators
Durbar High School alumni
Tri-Chandra College alumni
Nepalese Hindus
Sajha Puraskar winners
Khas people
Bahun